Cabezas cortadas (English: Severed Heads, sometimes translated as Cutting Heads; Portuguese: Cabeças Cortadas), is a 1970 Spanish-Brazilian film directed by Glauber Rocha.

Cast
Pierre Clémenti
Francisco Rabal
Rosa Maria Penna
Luis Ciges
Emma Cohen
Marta May
Telesforo Sanchez
Victor Israel

References

External links
 

1970 drama films
1970 films
Brazilian drama films
Films about dictators
Films directed by Glauber Rocha
Spanish drama films
1970s Spanish-language films
1970s Spanish films